Glenn Berry (November 4, 1904 – October 31, 1995) was an American gymnast. He competed in seven events at the 1928 Summer Olympics.

References

1904 births
1995 deaths
American male artistic gymnasts
Olympic gymnasts of the United States
Gymnasts at the 1928 Summer Olympics
Sportspeople from Kansas